Devitsa is a rural locality (a selo) and the administrative center of Devitskoye Rural Settlement, Semiluksky District, Voronezh Oblast, Russia. The population was

Geography 
Devitsa is located on the Veduga River, 2 km of from Semiluki (the district's administrative centre) by road. Semiluki is the nearest rural locality.

References 

Rural localities in Semiluksky District